Lester Fernandez (born 6 December 1986), is an Indian professional footballer who plays as an attacking midfielder for Kenkre in the I-League. He is currently a football coach too.

Career

Early career
Born in Bangalore, Karnataka, Fernandez graduated from the Tata Football Academy in 2007. He then signed his first professional deal with Dempo of the I-League. He then signed for Vasco next season before signing with Salgaocar the next season in 2009.

He then signed for I-League side Pune F.C. in 2010. After the 2010–11 season, Fernandez was voted the Fans' Player of the Year.

Prayag United and Mumbai Tigers
On 11 June 2012 it was announced that Fernandez had been sold to fellow I-League side Prayag United for Rs 20 lakh. He made his debut for Prayag United on 7 October 2012 against Air India in a league match. He came on in the 82nd minute for C.K. Vineeth as Prayag United won 5–1. 

After the 2012–13 season, Fernandez left Prayag United due to lack of playing time and signed for Mumbai Tigers who were expected to participate in the I-League for the 2013–14 season. However, before the season began, it was announced that Mumbai Tigers had dropped out of the I-League, meaning that Fernandez would not participate in the league.

Pune
On 18 February 2014 it was announced that Fernandez had re-signed with former club Pune. He made his return debut for the club on 19 February 2014 against Mohammedan. He came on as a 65th-minute substitute for Anthony D'Souza as Pune won 2–0.

Atletico de Kolkata 
Fernandez was drafted by Indian Super League franchise Atlético de Kolkata in the 10th round. In his second match against Chennaiyin FC, he won the ISL Emerging player of the match award.

International
In February 2012 Fernandez was selected into India head coach Savio Medeira's 30-man squad. He then made his international debut for India on 23 February 2012 against Oman in which he started and played 56 minutes as India lost 5–1.

Honours
Atlético de Kolkata
Indian Super League: 2014

References

External links
 I-League Profile.

1986 births
Living people
Footballers from Bangalore
Indian footballers
Dempo SC players
Vasco SC players
Salgaocar FC players
Pune FC players
United SC players
Bharat FC players
ATK (football club) players
Association football midfielders
I-League players
Indian Super League players
India international footballers